Thiyagu is a 1990 Indian Tamil-language drama film directed by S. P. Muthuraman and written by Sivasankari. Produced by AVM Productions. It is based on the TV series Oru Manithanin Kathai, itself based on Sivasankari's novel by the same name. The film stars Raghuvaran, reprising his role from the TV series. It was released on 5 October 1990, and failed commercially.

Plot

Cast 
 Raghuvaran as Thiyagu
 Nizhalgal Ravi as Nana
 S. P. Balasubrahmanyam as Dr. Reddy
 Rekha
 Devilalitha as Thiyagu's wife
 Sudha
 Dhilip as Arvind
 Babloo

Production 
When M. Saravanan of AVM Productions met Charuhasan, he asked about controlling budget in art films for which Charuhasan said the film costs can be recovered after selling rights for national television for which they provide , which impressed Saravanan and he decided to make a "purposeful movie". Oru Manithanin Kathai, a novel written by Sivasankari and serialised in the magazine Ananda Vikatan in 1978–79, was adapted into a TV series by the same name in 1985 and starred Raghuvaran. AVM later decided to adapt this series into a feature film titled Thiyagu; Raghuvaran returned in the same role, and S. P. Muthuraman was hired as director. Muthuraman charged no fee for the film.

Soundtrack 
The music was composed by Shankar–Ganesh.

Release and reception 
Thiyagu was released on 5 October 1990. The film was screened for the then chief minister of Tamil Nadu M. Karunanidhi who liked it. A filmed speech of his was attached to the final cut. The government issued a notice saying that people can come and watch for free in theaters. Despite this, it failed commercially and won no awards. Saravanan revealed when he wanted to sell the satellite rights to Doordarshan, they refused, saying the film lacked "entertainment value". Despite giving the satellite rights to Sun TV, it never aired in the channel. Saravanan worried that the film which was intended to propagate the ill-effects of alcoholism did not reach the audience.

References

Bibliography

External links 
 

1990 drama films
1990 films
1990s Tamil-language films
AVM Productions films
Films about alcoholism
Films based on adaptations
Films directed by S. P. Muthuraman
Indian drama films